Muhammad 'Ilish (1802 - 1882 CE) (1217 - 1299 AH), more commonly referred to in Muslim works simply as 'Ilish or Sheikh 'Ilish, was a 19th-century CE Egyptian Muslim jurist of Tripolitanian origin. 'Illish was an important late scholar of the Maliki school of Islamic jurisprudence (fiqh). He is perhaps the last of a line of widely read and respected sources of traditional fatwas of the late Maliki school from an Azharite scholar. 'Ilish was an extremely popular teacher at Al-Azhar. His lectures were regularly attended by audiences of over 200 students. In July 1854, 'Ilish was appointed the Maliki Mufti of Al-Azhar. By the time of his death in 1882, 'Ilish was one of the premier leaders of Egyptian scholarly society. His Manh al-Jalil as well as his Fatawa are widely used today among traditional Malikis for fatwa positions of the school.

See also 

 List of Ash'aris and Maturidis

References 

1802 births
1882 deaths
Asharis
Al-Azhar University alumni
Egyptian Maliki scholars
Egyptian people of Libyan descent
Muslims from the Ottoman Empire